Vizianagaram Lok Sabha constituency is one of the twenty-five lok sabha constituencies of Andhra Pradesh in India. As per the Delimitation of Parliamentary and Assembly Constituencies Order (2008), it was formed with seven assembly segments belongs to Vizianagaram and Srikakulam districts .

Assembly segments 
The seven Assembly segments of Vizianagaram Lok Sabha constituency are:

Members of Parliament

Election results

General Election 2019

General Election 2014

General Election 2009

See also 
 List of constituencies of the Andhra Pradesh Legislative Assembly

References

External links 
Vizianagaram lok sabha  constituency election 2019 date and schedule

Lok Sabha constituencies in Andhra Pradesh
Vizianagaram district